The 2019–20 Argentine Primera División - Superliga Argentina (officially the Superliga Quilmes Clásica for sponsorship reasons) was the 130th season of top-flight professional football in Argentina. The league season began on 26 July 2019 and ended on 9 March 2020.

Twenty-four teams competed in the league, twenty-two returning from the 2018–19 season and two promoted from the 2018–19 Primera B Nacional (Arsenal and Central Córdoba (SdE)). Racing were the defending champions.

On 7 March 2020, Boca Juniors won their 34th national league championship in the last round after they defeated Gimnasia y Esgrima (LP) 1–0 and, simultaneously, Atlético Tucumán and River Plate drew 1–1.

On 28 April 2020 AFA announced the abandonment of the Copa de la Superliga and the culmination of the 2019–20 season in all of its league competitions due to the COVID-19 pandemic. International berths (except for the ones allocated to the Copa de la Superliga and Copa Argentina winners) were awarded according to the aggregate table of both the Primera División and Copa de la Superliga first stage until 17 March, when the Copa de la Superliga was suspended, while no teams were relegated in this season. Relegation from Primera División was suspended until 2022.

Competition format 
The season was contested by 24 teams. The season began on 26 July 2019 and was scheduled to end on 31 May 2020, featuring two tournaments: the Superliga and the Copa de la Superliga. In the Superliga, which was played from 26 July 2019 to 9 March 2020, each team played the other 23 teams in a single round-robin tournament. At the conclusion of the league season, the Primera División teams would take part in the Copa de la Superliga, in which they were sorted into two groups of 12 teams each. Unlike the previous season, in which only the league matches were considered for international tournaments qualification and relegation, in this season Copa de la Superliga first stage matches would also be taken into account, for a total of 34 games.

Club information

Stadia and locations

Personnel

Managerial changes 

Interim managers
1.  Néstor Apuzzo was interim manager in the 2019 Copa Libertadores group B 6th round and the 2018–19 Copa Argentina round of 64.
2.  Diego Monarriz was interim manager in the 2018–19 Copa Argentina round of 64.
3.  Néstor Apuzzo was interim manager in the 7th–16th rounds.
4.  Fabio Radaelli was interim manager in the 9th round.
5.  Fernando Berón was interim manager in the 11th–13th, 15th–16th and the postponed 2nd rounds.
6.  Interim manager, but later promoted to manager.
7.  Martín De León was interim manager in the 15th round.
8.  Pablo Bonaveri was interim manager in the postponed 13th round.
9.  Pablo De Muner was interim manager in the 17th round.
10.  Leandro Romagnoli and  Hugo Tocalli were interim managers in the 22nd–23rd rounds and the 2020 Copa de la Superliga 1st round.
11.  Guillermo Morigi was interim manager in the 2020 Copa de la Superliga 1st round.
12.  Marcelo Mosset was interim manager in the 2020 Copa de la Superliga 1st round.
13. Interim managers, but later promoted to managers.
14. Interim managers in the Copa Diego Armando Maradona until the end of the tournament.
15.  Gabriel Graciani was interim manager in the Copa Diego Armando Maradona Fase Complementación 2nd–3rd rounds.
16. Interim manager in the Copa Diego Armando Maradona until the end of the tournament.
17. Interim manager in the 2019–20 Copa Argentina round of 64 and the Copa Diego Armando Maradona until the end of the tournament.
18. Interim manager in the Copa Diego Armando Maradona until the end of the tournament.
19. Interim manager in the Copa Diego Armando Maradona until the end of the tournament.

Foreign players

Players with 30 months in a row on the same team
 Santiago García (Godoy Cruz) has played 30 months in a row on the same team, therefore, he does not take foreign slot and Godoy Cruz were allowed to sign a seventh foreign player.

Players holding Argentinian dual nationality
They do not take foreign slot.

 Matko Miljevic (Argentinos Juniors)
 Joel Soñora (Arsenal)
 Dylan Gissi (Atlético Tucumán)
 Dani Osvaldo (Banfield)
 Frank Fabra (Boca Juniors)
 Lucas Barrios (Gimnasia y Esgrima (LP))
 Norberto Briasco-Balekian (Huracán)
 Pablo Hernández (Independiente)
 Alan Soñora (Independiente)
 Gabriel Arias (Racing)
 Carlos Olses (Racing)
 Andrés Cubas (Talleres (C))
 José Mauri (Talleres (C))

Source: AFA

League table

Results 
Teams played every other team once (either at home or away) completing a total of 23 rounds.

Season statistics

Top goalscorers

Source: AFA

Top assists

Source: AFA

International qualification
International qualification for the 2021 season presented a change from previous ones. The 2019–20 Superliga champions, 2020 Copa de la Superliga champions and 2019–20 Copa Argentina champions would earn a berth to the 2021 Copa Libertadores, however, with the decision by AFA to end the season on 28 April, only the Superliga champions were awarded a berth. The berth originally allocated to the Copa de la Superliga champions went instead to the winners of the 2020 Copa de la Liga Profesional to be played from October 2020 to January 2021, while the berth for the Copa Argentina champions remained in place, provided that government directives allow for the realization of that competition.

The remaining berths to the 2021 Copa Libertadores as well as the ones to the 2021 Copa Sudamericana were determined by an aggregate table of the 2019–20 Superliga and 2020 Copa de la Superliga first stage tournaments. The top three teams in the aggregate table not already qualified for any international tournament qualified for the Copa Libertadores, while the next six teams qualified for the Copa Sudamericana. On 11 December 2020, with the confirmation that the Copa Argentina would not be completed in time to award its winner the Argentina 3 berth into the 2021 Copa Libertadores, AFA decided to transfer the berth to the best team of the aggregate table of the season not yet qualified, and all other lower berths were moved down as a result.

Aggregate table

Relegation
Relegation at the end of the season would be based on coefficients, which take into consideration the points obtained by the clubs during the present season (aggregate table points) and the two previous seasons (only seasons at the top flight are counted). The total tally is then divided by the number of games played in the top flight over those three seasons and an average is calculated. The three teams with the worst average at the end of the season would have been relegated to Primera B Nacional, however, with the decision by AFA to declare the culmination of the season it was also decided that no teams would be relegated.

Source: AFA

See also
2020 Copa de la Superliga
2019–20 Primera B Nacional
2019–20 Torneo Federal A
2019–20 Copa Argentina

References

External links
 AFA - SITIO OFICIAL
 Superliga Argentina official website

Argentine Primera División seasons
2019–20 in Argentine football leagues